Below are the rosters for the 1991 FIFA Women's World Cup tournament in China. The 12 national teams involved in the tournament were required to register a squad of 18 players, including at least two goalkeepers. Only players in these squads were eligible to take part in the tournament.

Group A

China PR
Head coach: Shang Ruihua

Denmark
Head coach: Keld Gantzhorn

New Zealand
Head coach:  Dave Boardman

Norway
Head coach: Even Pellerud

Group B

Brazil
Head coach: Fernando Pires

Japan
Head coach: Tamotsu Suzuki

Sweden
Head coach: Gunilla Paijkull

United States
Head coach: Anson Dorrance

Group C

Chinese Taipei
Head coach: Chong Tsu-pin

Germany
Head coach: Gero Bisanz

Italy
Head coach: Sergio Guenza

Nigeria
Head coach:  Jo Bonfrère

External links
1991 FIFA Women's World Cup - Teams
Technical report
Sweden caps and goals

Squads, 1991 Fifa Women's World Cup
FIFA Women's World Cup squads